Johannes Mononen (born 4 May 1991) is a Finnish footballer, who currently represents AC Oulu of Ykkönen, the second highest level of football in Finland. He is also part of Finland national under-18 football team. He is a defender and usually plays the position of central defender.
Mononen's youth team was JIPPO from Joensuu, for which he also played 13 matches in Ykkönen, the second highest level of football in Finland, in 2008. After that he made a contract with Tampere United of the premier league. He has been on trial with Italian teams Inter Milan and Chievo Verona.

References

Finnish footballers
Tampere United players
Veikkausliiga players
1991 births
Living people
JIPPO players
Association football defenders